Martha Yoko Takane Imay is a Mexican mathematician whose research topics include linear algebra, representation theory, and algebraic combinatorics. She is a professor at the National Autonomous University of Mexico (UNAM) and a researcher in the UNAM Institute of Mathematics.

Education and career
Takane studied mathematics at UNAM, earning a bachelor's degree in 1986, master's degree in 1988, and PhD in 1992.

She has been a faculty member at UNAM since 1991 and a researcher in the Mathematical Institute since 1992. She was also a postdoctoral researcher at the University of Bielefeld and University of Trondheim, and has also taught in the Autonomous University of Mexico State since 2006.

She has also been active in encouraging women in mathematics in Mexico, and co-founded a center for gender studies at UNAM.

Recognition
Takane won the 1992 Weizmann Prize for the best doctoral thesis in the exact sciences in Mexico. She was elected to the Mexican Academy of Sciences in 1998. In 2007 UNAM gave her their Sor Juana Inés de la Cruz prize.

References

Year of birth missing (living people)
Living people
20th-century Mexican mathematicians
Mexican women mathematicians
National Autonomous University of Mexico alumni
Academic staff of the National Autonomous University of Mexico
Academic staff of the Autonomous University of Mexico State
Members of the Mexican Academy of Sciences
21st-century Mexican mathematicians
20th-century women mathematicians
21st-century women mathematicians